The marbled velvet gecko (Oedura marmorata) is a gecko endemic to Australia.

References

Oedura
Reptiles described in 1842
Taxa named by John Edward Gray
Geckos of Australia